Traditional gender roles among Native American and First Nations peoples tend to vary greatly by region and community. As with all Pre-Columbian era societies, historical traditions may or may not reflect contemporary attitudes. Gender roles exhibited by indigenous communities have been transformed in some aspect by Eurocentric, patriarchal norms and the perpetration of systematic oppression. In many communities, these things are not discussed with outsiders.

Apache

Traditional Apache gender roles have many of the same skills learned by both females and males. All children traditionally learn how to cook, follow tracks, skin leather, sew stitches, ride horses, and use weapons. Typically  women gather vegetation such as fruits, roots, and seed. Women would often prepare the food. Men would use weapons and tools to hunt animals such as buffalos. It is expected that women do not participate in hunting, but her role as a mother is important. A puberty rite ceremony for young girls is an important event, here the girl accepts her role as a woman, and is blessed with a long life and fertility. Apache people typically live in matrilocal households, where a married couple will live with the wife's family.

Eastern Woodland Societies

Eastern Woodland communities vary widely in whether they divide labor based on sex. In general, like in the Plains nations, women own the home while men's work may involve more travel. Narragansett men in farming communities have traditionally helped clear the fields, cultivate the crops and assist with the harvesting, whereas women hold authority in the home. Among the Lenape, men and women have both participated in agriculture and hunting according to age and ability, although primary leadership in agriculture traditionally belongs to women, while men have generally held more responsibility in the area of hunting. Whether gained by hunting, fishing or agriculture, older Lenape women take responsibility for community food distribution. Land management, whether used for hunting or agriculture, also is the traditional responsibility of Lenape women.

Historically, a number of social norms in Eastern Woodland communities demonstrate a balance of power held between women and men. Men and women have traditionally both had the final say over who they would end up marrying, though parents usually have a great deal of influence as well.

Hopi

The Hopi (in what is now the Hopi Reservation in northeastern Arizona) are traditionally both matriarchal and matrilineal, with egalitarian roles in community, and no sense of superiority or inferiority based on sex or gender. Both women and men have traditionally participated in politics and community management, although colonization has brought patriarchal influences that have seen changes in the traditional structures and formerly-higher status of women. However, even with these changes, matrilineal structures still remain, along with the central role of the mothers and grandmothers in the family, household and clan structure.

Haudenosaunee

The Haudenosaunee are a matriarchal society. Traditionally, the Clan Mother has held the ultimate power over all decisions, though her specific role has varied by Nation. In this structure the men under her are the Chiefs, serving primarily in a diplomatic capacity. Tradition holds that she has the power to veto any idea proposed by her chiefs, and that both the naming traditions and transfer of political power are matrilineal.

Kalapuya

The Kalapuya had a patriarchal society consisting of bands, or villages, usually led in social and political life by a male leader or group of leaders. The primary leader was generally the man with the greatest wealth. While female leaders did exist, it was more common for a woman to gain status in spiritual leadership. Kalapuya bands typically consisted of extended families of related men, their wives, and children. Ceremonial leaders could be male or female, and spiritual power was regarded as more valuable than material wealth. As such the spiritual leaders were often more influential than the political leaders.

Kalapuya males usually hunted while the women and young children gathered food and set up camps. As the vast majority of the Kalapuya diet consisted largely of gathered food, the women supplied most of the sustenance. Women were also in charge of food preparation, preservation and storage.  The food hunted by men usually consisted of deer and elk, and fish from the rivers of the Willamette valley, including salmon and eel. Plants gathered included wapato, tarweed seeds, hazelnuts, and especially camas. The camas bulbs were cooked by women into a cake-like bread which was considered valuable.

Women were involved in the community life and expressed their individual opinions. When a man wanted to marry a woman, he had to pay a bride price to her father. If a man slept with or raped another man's wife, he was required to pay the bride price to the husband. If he did not, he would be cut on the arm or face. If the man could pay the price, he could take the woman to be his wife.

There is reference to gender variant people being accepted in Kalapuya culture. A Kalapuya spiritual person named Ci'mxin is recalled by John B. Hudson in his interviews from the Kalapuya Texts: 

After the arrival of Europeans to the Willamette Valley, and creation of the Grand Ronde Reservation and boarding schools such as Chemawa Indian School, children of the Kalapuya people were taught the typical gender roles of Europeans.

Inuit

Arvilingjuarmiut 
The Arvilingjuarmiut, also known as Netsilik, are Inuit who live mainly in Kugaaruk and Gjoa Haven, Nunavut, Canada. They follow the tradition of kipijuituq, which refers to instances where predominantly biologically male infants are raised as females. Often the decision for an infant to become Kipijuituq is left to the grandparents based on the reactions of the infant in the womb. Children would later go on to choose their respective genders in their pubescent years once they have undergone a rite of passage that includes hunting animals. Similar in concept is sipiniq  from the Igloolik and Nunavik areas.

Aranu’tiq 
Aranu’tiq is a fluid category among the Chugach, an Alutiiq people from Alaska, that neither conforms to masculine or feminine categories. Gender expression is fluid and children typically dress in a combination of both masculine and feminine clothing. Newborn babies are not regarded as new humans but rather as tarnina or inuusia which refers to their soul, personality, shade and are named after an older deceased relative as a way of reincarnation as the relationship between the child and others would go on to match those of the deceased.

Navajo

Similar to other indigenous cultures, Navajo girls participate in a rite of passage ceremony that is a celebration of the transformation into womanhood. This event is marked with new experiences and roles within the community. Described as Kinaaldá, the ritual takes place over four days, during the individual's first or second menstrual period. The reason for this is rooted deeply in Navajo supernatural beliefs and their creation myths. 

The third gender role of nádleehi (meaning "one who is transformed" or "one who changes"), beyond contemporary Anglo-American definition limits of gender, is part of the Navajo Nation society, a "two-spirit" cultural role. The renowned 19th century Navajo artist Hosteen Klah (1849–1896) is an example.

Navajo values emphasize the masculine and the feminine, despite the ritual being centered around feminine gender roles. Historically, it is recorded that Navajo cultures respected the autonomy of women and their equality to men in the tribe, in multiple spheres of life within their society. Contrarily, the primary discourse in Western society regarding girls' puberty is associated with discreteness, to be experienced privately for concern of shame and embarrassment regarding menstruation and bodily changes.

Nez Perce 

During the early colonial period, Nez Perce communities tended to have specific gender roles. Men were responsible for the production of equipment used for hunting, fishing and protection of their communities as well as the performance of these activities. Men made up the governing bodies of villages which were composed of a council and headman.

Nez Perce women in the early contact period were responsible for maintaining the household which included the production of utilitarian tools for the home. The harvest of medicinal plants was the responsibility of the women in the community due to their extensive knowledge. Edibles were harvested by both women and children. Women also regularly participated in politics, but due to their responsibilities to their families and medicine gathering, they did not hold office. Critical knowledge regarding culture and tradition were passed down by all the elders of the community.

Ojibwe 

Historically, most Ojibwe cultures believe that men and women are usually suited towards specific tasks. Hunting is usually a men's task, and first-kill feasts are held as an honour for hunters. The gathering of wild plants is more often a women's occupation; however, these tasks often overlapped, with men and women working on the same project but with different duties. Despite hunting itself being more commonly a male task, women also participate by building lodges, processing hides into apparel, and drying meat. In contemporary Ojibwe culture, all community members participate in this work, regardless of gender.

Wild rice (Ojibwe: manoomin) harvesting is done by all community members, though often women will knock the rice grains into the canoe while men paddle and steer the canoe through the reeds. For Ojibwe women, the wild rice harvest can be especially significant as it has traditionally been a chance to express their autonomy:

While the Ojibwe continue to harvest wild rice by canoe, both men and women now take turns knocking rice grains.

Both Ojibwe men and women create beadwork and music, and maintain the traditions of storytelling and traditional medicine. In regards to clothing, Ojibwe women have historically worn hide dresses with leggings and moccasins, while men would wear leggings and breechcloths. After trading with European settlers became more frequent, the Ojibwe began to adopt characteristics of European dress.

Osage

Sioux

The Lakota, Dakota and Nakota peoples, in addition to other Siouan-speaking people like the Omaha, Osage and Ponca, are patriarchal or patrilineal and have historically had highly defined gender roles. In such tribes, hereditary leadership would pass through the male line, while children are considered to belong to the father and his clan. If a woman marries outside the tribe, she is no longer considered to be part of it, and her children would share the ethnicity and culture of their father. In the 19th century, the men customarily harvested wild rice whereas women harvested all other grain (among the Dakota or Santee). The winkte are a social category in Lakota culture, of male people who adopt the clothing, work, and mannerisms that Lakota culture usually considers feminine. Usually winkte are homosexual, and sometimes the word is also used for gay men who are not in any other way gender-variant.

See also
Native Americans in the United States – Gender roles
Indigenous feminism
Matriarchy (the Native Americans subsection)
Missing and murdered Indigenous women
Native American feminism
Patriarchy
Sexual victimization of Native American women
Two-Spirit

References

Gender
Gender
Gender
Gender
Gender in North America
Native American
First Nations
Two-spirit
Native American women